Gaute Kivistik (born 18 June 1971 in Tartu), better known under his pen name of Rohke Debelak (or Debelakk), is an Estonian humorist and journalist, best known as the author and presenter of a satirical news programme on Raadio Kuku.

Awards 
In 2008, Kivistik was awarded the yearly Oskar Luts humour prize, named after the Estonian writer Oskar Luts.

References 

1971 births
Living people
Estonian humorists
Estonian radio personalities
Estonian journalists
People from Tartu
Writers from Tartu